Earthworms are invasive species throughout the world. Of a total of about 6,000 species of earthworm, about 120 species are widely distributed around the globe. These are the peregrine or cosmopolitan earthworms. Some of these are invasive species in many regions.

Australia 

Australia has 650 known species of native earthworm that survive in both rich and in nutrient-poor conditions where they may be sensitive to changes in the environment. The total native species numbers are predicted to exceed 1,000.

Introduced species are commonly found in agricultural environments along with persistent natives. 66 exotic species are known by 1999, most of which have been introduced accidentally.

North America 

Approximately 182 earthworm taxa in twelve families are reported from the United States and Canada, of which sixty (about 33%) are introduced.  Only two genera of lumbricid earthworms are indigenous to North America while introduced genera have spread to areas without any native species, especially in the north where forest ecosystems rely on a large amount of undecayed leaf matter. When worms decompose that leaf layer, the ecology may shift making the habitat unsurvivable for certain species of trees, ferns and herbs. Larger earthworms such as the nightcrawler Lumbricus terrestris and L. rubellus and the Alabama (technically Asian) jumper, Amynthas agrestis, can be eaten by adult salamanders, which is beneficial for their populations, but they are too large for juvenile salamanders to consume, which leads to a net loss in salamander population.

Currently there is no economically feasible method for controlling invasive earthworms in forests. Earthworms normally spread slowly, but can be quickly introduced by human activities such as construction earthmoving, plantings, and the release of worms used as fishing bait.

United Kingdom

For the 69-70 known species, a recent threat to earthworm populations in the UK is the New Zealand flatworm (Arthurdendyus triangulatus), which feeds upon earthworms but has no local natural predator itself. Sightings of the New Zealand flatworm have been mainly localised, but it has spread extensively since its introduction in 1960 through contaminated soil and plant pots. Any sightings of the flatworm should be reported to the Scottish Crop Research Institute, which is monitoring its spread.

East Asia 
In Taiwan, Pontoscolex corethrurus is known invasive with evidence of it displacing native worms. Eudrilus eugeniae has potential to do the same. For vermicompost, the native or naturalized Perionyx excavatus is recommended.

Control 
At this point there is no known way to remove the earthworms from the soil, so proposals have focused on ways to slow their spread.  One simple measure is to reduce the number of worms released during fishing practices.  The Minnesota Department of Natural Resources, in cooperation with local groups, has launched a public education campaign using posters in bait shops and other outreach efforts.

The movement of dirt from one location to the other could also be regulated so that dirt from areas where earthworms are common is not moved into forests without the invasive species. To prevent the spread of invasive earthworms, it is recommended that people should only purchase compost or mulch that has been heated to appropriate temperatures and duration following protocols that reduce pathogens and kill the earthworm cocoons, or eggs.

In areas that have already been colonized, the number of worms can be reduced by removal of introduced shrubs such as common buckthorn (Rhamnus cathartica) and honeysuckle (e.g., Lonicera × bella), which  produce leaf litter favored by worms. This may help mitigate negative impacts on the ecosystem.

Mustard pours can be used to survey for invasive worms at a site.  A mustard pour can be created by mixing a gallon of water with one third cup of ground yellow mustard seed.  Pouring the solution slowly over the soil will drive worms to the soil's surface without harming the plants.  People with invasive worms on their property are advised not to move plants or soil from their property.

References

Further reading
 Blakemore, R. J. American Earthworms from North of the Rio Grande- a Species Checklist. Rep. Yokohama, Japan: YNU, 2006.
 Campbell, Neil A., and Jane B. Reece. Biology. San Francisco: Pearson Benjamin Cummings, 2009.
 Bohlen, Patrick J., Derek M. Pelletier, Peter M. Groffman, Timothy J. Fahey, and Melany C. Fisk. "Influence of earthworm invasion on redistribution and retention of soil carbon and nitrogen in northern temperate forests." Ecosystems 7 (2004): 13-27.
 Eisenhauer, Nico, Stephan Partsch, Dennis Parkinson, and Stefan Scheu. "Invasion of a deciduous forest by earthworms: changes in soil chemistry, microflora, microarthropds, and vegetation." Soil Biology and Biochemistry 39 (2007): 1099-110.
 Frelich, Lee E., Cindy M. Hale, and Stefan Scheu. "Earthworm invasion into previously earthworm-free temperate and boreal forests." Biological Invasions 8 (2006): 1235-245. Print.
 Hendrix, P. F., G. H. Baker, and M. A. Callaham Jr. "Invasion of exotic earthworms into ecosystems inhabited by native earthworms." Biological Invasions 8 (2006): 1287-300.
 Szlavecz, Katalin, Sarah A. Placella, and Richard V. Pouyat. "Invasive earthworm species and nitrogen cycling in remnant forest patches." Applied Soil Ecology 32 (2006): 54-62.